John P. Bobo Field is a baseball venue in Lewiston, New York, United States. It is home to the Niagara Purple Eagles baseball team of the NCAA Division I Metro Atlantic Athletic Conference (MAAC). The field's namesake is John P. Bobo, a Niagara Falls native and 1965 alumni.

History 
In 2017, the field underwent renovations included a full synthetic turf field, expanded seating areas, a new scoreboard and dugouts, a press box and a new backstop with netting.

Features 
The field's features include a synthetic turf playing surface, a press box, an electronic scoreboard, dugouts, a brick backstop, restrooms, and concessions.

See also 
 List of NCAA Division I baseball venues

References 

Niagara Purple Eagles baseball
College baseball venues in the United States
Baseball venues in New York (state)